Roy Owen Haynes (born March 13, 1925) is an American jazz drummer. He is among the most recorded drummers in jazz. In a career lasting over 80 years, he has played swing, bebop, jazz fusion, avant-garde jazz and is considered a pioneer of jazz drumming. "Snap Crackle" was a nickname given to him in the 1950s.

He has led bands such as the Hip Ensemble. His albums Fountain of Youth and Whereas were nominated for a Grammy Award. He was inducted into the Modern Drummer Hall of Fame in 1999. His son Graham Haynes is a cornetist; another son Craig Holiday Haynes and grandson Marcus Gilmore are both drummers.

Career

Haynes was born in the Roxbury section of Boston, Massachusetts, United States to Gustavas and Edna Haynes, immigrants from the Barbados. A younger brother, Michael E. Haynes, became an important leader in the black community of Massachusetts, working with Martin Luther King Jr. during the civil rights movement, representing Roxbury in the Massachusetts House of Representatives, and for forty years serving as pastor of the Twelfth Baptist Church, where King had been a member while he pursued his doctoral degree at Boston University.

Haynes made his professional debut in 1942 in his native Boston, and began his full-time professional career in 1945. From 1947 to 1949 he worked with saxophonist Lester Young, and from 1949 to 1952 was a member of saxophonist Charlie Parker's quintet. He also recorded at the time with pianist Bud Powell and saxophonists Wardell Gray and Stan Getz. From 1953 to 1958, he toured with singer Sarah Vaughan and recorded with her.

A tribute song was recorded by Jim Keltner and Charlie Watts of the Rolling Stones, and he appeared on stage with the Allman Brothers Band in 2006 and Page McConnell of Phish in 2008. "Age seems to have just passed him by," Watts observed. "He's eighty-three and in 2006 he was voted Best Contemporary Jazz Drummer [in Modern Drummer magazine's readers' poll]. He's amazing."

In 2008, Haynes lent his voice to the open-world video game Grand Theft Auto IV, to voice himself as the DJ for the fictional classic jazz radio station, Jazz Nation Radio 108.5.

Haynes is known to celebrate his birthday on stage, in recent years at the Blue Note Jazz Club in New York City. In 2020, during the COVID-19 pandemic, his 95th birthday celebration was cancelled.

Awards and honors
A Life in Time – The Roy Haynes Story was named by The New Yorker magazine as one of the Best Boxed Sets of 2007 and was nominated for an award by the Jazz Journalist's Association.

WKCR-FM, New York, surveyed Haynes's career in 301 hours of programming, January 11–23, 2009.

Esquire named Roy Haynes one of the best-dressed men in America in 1960, along with Fred Astaire, Miles Davis, Clark Gable, and Cary Grant.

In 1994, Haynes was awarded the Danish Jazzpar prize, and in 1996 the French government knighted him with the Chevalier de l'Ordre des Arts et des Lettres, France's top literary and artistic honor. In 1995, the U.S. National Endowment for the Arts named Haynes as a NEA Jazz_Master. Haynes received honorary doctorates from the Berklee College of Music (1991), and the New England Conservatory (2004), as well as a Peabody Medal, the highest honor bestowed by the Peabody Institute of The Johns Hopkins University, in 2012. He was inducted into the DownBeat magazine Hall of Fame in 2004. On October 9, 2010, he was awarded the Mid Atlantic Arts Foundation's BNY Mellon Jazz Living Legacy Award at the Kennedy Center for the Performing Arts in Washington, DC.

In 2001, Haynes's album Birds of a Feather: A Tribute to Charlie Parker was nominated for the 44th Annual Grammy Awards as Best Jazz Instrumental Album.
On December 22, 2010, he was named a recipient of a Grammy Lifetime Achievement Award by the National Academy of Recording Arts and Sciences, and he received the award at the Special Merit Awards Ceremony & Nominees Reception of the 54th Annual Grammy Awards on February 11, 2012.

In 2019, Haynes was given the Lifetime Achievement Award by the Jazz Foundation of America at the 28th Annual Loft Party.

Discography

As leader/co-leader 
 Busman's Holiday (EmArcy, 1954)
 Roy Haynes Modern Group (Swing, 1955) – recorded in 1954
 Jazz Abroad (Mercury, 1956) – recorded in 1953. split album with Quincy Jones.
 We Three with Paul Chambers & Phineas Newborn (New Jazz, 1959) – recorded in 1958
 Just Us (New Jazz, 1960) 
 Out of the Afternoon (Impulse!, 1962)
 Cracklin' with Booker Ervin (New Jazz, 1963)
 Cymbalism (New Jazz, 1963)
 People (Pacific Jazz, 1964)
 Hip Ensemble (Mainstream, 1971)
 Senyah (Mainstream, 1972)
 Booty with Blue Mitchell, Charles Kynard, Charles Williams (Mainstream, 1974)
 Togyu (RCA, 1975) – recorded in 1973
 Jazz a Confronto Vol. 29 (Horo, 1976)
 Sugar Roy (Kitty, 1976)
 Thank You Thank You (Galaxy, 1977)
 Vistalite (Galaxy, 1979) – recorded in 1977
 True or False (Freelance, 1986)
 Encounters with Mark Isaacs, Dave Holland (ABC, 1990) – recorded in 1988
 Equipoise (Mainstream, 1991) – reissue of Hip Ensemble (1971) with 1 additional track "Roy's Tune"
 When It's Haynes It Roars (Dreyfus Jazz, 1992)
 Live at the Riverbop (Marge, 1993) – live recorded in 1979
 Homecoming (Evidence, 1994) – live recorded in 1992
 Te Vou! (Dreyfus Jazz, 1994)
 My Shining Hour with Thomas Clausen's Jazzparticipants (Storyville, 1995) – recorded in 1994
 Praise (Dreyfus Jazz, 1998) 
 The Roy Haynes Trio featuring Danilo Perez & John Patitucci (Verve, 2000) – recorded in 1999
 Birds of a Feather: A Tribute to Charlie Parker (Dreyfus Jazz, 2001) – Grammy-nominated album
 Love Letters (Eighty-Eight's, 2002)
 Whereas (Dreyfus Jazz, 2006)
 The Island (Explore, 2007) – recorded in 1990
 Roy-Alty (Dreyfus Jazz, 2011)

Compilations 
 Fountain of Youth (Dreyfus Jazz, 2004) – Grammy-nominated album
 Quiet Fire (Galaxy, 2004) – reissue of Thank You Thank You (1977) and Vistalite (1977)
 A Life in Time: The Roy Haynes Story (Dreyfus Jazz, 2007)[3CD + DVD-Video] – Grammy-nominated track included

As sideman 
In recorded year order
1947: Lester Young, The Complete Aladdin Recordings of Lester Young (Blue Note, 1995)[2CD]
1949: Kai Winding, Modern Jazz Trombones (Prestige, 1952)
1949–1950: Stan Getz, Stan Getz Quartets (Prestige)
1950: Charlie Parker, Bird at St. Nick's (Jazz Workshop, 1958)
1949–51: Bud Powell, The Amazing Bud Powell (Blue Note, 1952)[10 inch]
1950–52: Wardell Gray, Memorial Album (Prestige, 1964)[2LP]
1951–53: Miles Davis, Miles Davis and Horns (Prestige, 1956)
1950–54: Stan Getz, The Complete Roost Recordings (Blue Note, 1997)
1954: Sarah Vaughan, Sarah Vaughan (EmArcy, 1955)
1954?: Cal Tjader, Vibist (Savoy, 1954)
1954?: Eddie Shu, I Only Have Eyes For Shu (Bethlehem, 1955)
1955: Sarah Vaughan, In the Land of Hi-Fi (EmArcy, 1955)
1955: Nat Adderley, Introducing Nat Adderley (Wing, 1955)
1949–56: Milt Jackson, Meet Milt Jackson (Savoy, 1956)
1956: Red Rodney Quintet, Modern Music from Chicago (Fantasy, 1983)
1954–57: Sarah Vaughan, Swingin' Easy (EmArcy, 1957)
1957: Sonny Rollins, The Sound of Sonny (Riverside, 1957)
1958: Sarah Vaughan, After Hours at the London House (Mercury, 1959)
1958: Thelonious Monk, Thelonious in Action  (Riverside, 1958) – live
1958: Thelonious Monk, Misterioso (Riverside, 1958) – live
1958: Thelonious Monk, Live at the Five Spot Discovery! (Blue Note, 1993) 
1958: Art Farmer, Portrait of Art Farmer (Contemporary, 1958)
1958: Art Blakey, Drums Around the Corner (Blue Note, 1999)
1958: Sonny Rollins, Brass & Trio (MetroJazz, 1958)
1958: Dorothy Ashby, In a Minor Groove (New Jazz, 1958)
1958: John Handy, In the Vernacular (Roulette, 1958)
1958: George Shearing, Latin Affair (Capitol, 1959)
1959: Randy Weston, Live at the Five Spot (United Artists, 1959) – live
1959: Kenny Burrell, A Night at the Vanguard (Argo, 1959) – live
1959: Phineas Newborn, Jr. Piano Portraits by Phineas Newborn (Roulette, 1959)
1959: Sonny Stitt, The Sonny Side of Stitt (Roost, 1960)
1959: Phineas Newborn, Jr. I Love a Piano (Roulette, 1960)
1959: Lee Konitz, You and Lee (Verve, 1959)
1960: Eric Dolphy, Outward Bound (New Jazz, 1960)
1960: Eric Dolphy, Out There (New Jazz, 1961)
1960: Eric Dolphy, Far Cry (New Jazz, 1962)
1960: Etta Jones, Don't Go to Strangers (Prestige, 1960)
1960: Booker Little, Booker Little (Time, 1960)
1960: Betty Roché, Singin' & Swingin' (Prestige, 1960)
1960: Tommy Flanagan, The Tommy Flanagan Trio (Moodsville, 1960)
1960: Eddie "Lockjaw" Davis Big Band, Trane Whistle (Prestige, 1960)
1960: Oliver Nelson, Taking Care of Business (New Jazz, 1960)
1960: Oliver Nelson, Nocturne (Moodsville, 1961)
1960: Oliver Nelson, King Curtis & Jimmy Forrest, Soul Battle (Prestige, 1962)
1960: Sonny Stitt Stittsville, Sonny Side Up (Roost, 1961)
1960: Kai Winding & J. J. Johnson, The Great Kai & J. J. (Impulse!, 1961)
1960: Lem Winchester, Lem Winchester with Feeling (Moodsville, 1961)
1960: Steve Lacy, The Straight Horn of Steve Lacy (Candid, 1961)
1960: Ray Charles, Genius + Soul = Jazz (Impulse!, 1961)
1960: Oliver Nelson, Screamin' the Blues (New Jazz, 1961)
1960–61: Etta Jones, Something Nice (Prestige, 1961)
1961: Oliver Nelson, Straight Ahead (New Jazz, 1961)
1961: Oliver Nelson, The Blues and the Abstract Truth (Impulse!, 1961)
1961: Jaki Byard, Here's Jaki (New Jazz, 1961)
1961: Ted Curson, Plenty of Horn (Old Town, 1961)
1961: Stan Getz and Bob Brookmeyer, Recorded Fall 1961 (Verve, 1961)
1961: Stan Getz, Focus (Verve, 1962)
1962: Jackie Paris, The Song Is Paris (Impulse!, 1962)
1962: Roland Kirk, Domino (Mercury, 1962)
1962: Willis Jackson, Bossa Nova Plus (Prestige, 1962)
1960–62: Sonny Stitt, Stitt in Orbit (Roost, 1963)
1960–62: Jimmy Forrest, Soul Street (New Jazz, 1962)
1962: McCoy Tyner, Reaching Fourth (Impulse!, 1963)
1962: Ted Curson, Ted Curson Plays Fire Down Below (Prestige, 1963)
1961-63: John Coltrane, Impressions (Impulse!, 1963)
1961–63: John Coltrane, Newport '63 (Impulse!, 1993)
1963: Frank Wess, Yo Ho! Poor You, Little Me (Prestige, 1963)
1963: Andrew Hill, Black Fire (Blue Note, 1964)
1963: Andrew Hill, Smokestack (Blue Note, 1966)
1963: Jackie McLean, Destination... Out! (Blue Note, 1964)
1964: Jackie McLean, It's Time! (Blue Note, 1965)
1961–64: Jaki Byard, Out Front! (Prestige, 1965)
1964: Jimmy Witherspoon, Blue Spoon (Prestige, 1964)
1966: Stan Getz, The Stan Getz Quartet in Paris (Verve, 1967)
1966: Gary Burton, Tennessee Firebird (RCA, 1967)
1967: Gary Burton, Duster (RCA, 1967)
1966–68: Stan Getz, What the World Needs Now: Stan Getz Plays Burt Bacharach and Hal David (Verve, 1968)
1968: Archie Shepp, The Way Ahead (Impulse!, 1968)
1968: Chick Corea, Now He Sings, Now He Sobs (Solid State, 1968)
1968: Jack DeJohnette, The DeJohnette Complex (Milestone, 1969)
1969: Gary Burton, Country Roads & Other Places (RCA, 1968)
1969: Leon Thomas, Spirits Known and Unknown (Flying Dutchman, 1970)
1969: Oliver Nelson, Black, Brown and Beautiful (Flying Dutchman, 1970)
1969: Clifford Jordan, In the World (Strata-East, 1972)
1970: Leon Thomas, The Leon Thomas Album (Flying Dutchman, 1970)
1971: Pharoah Sanders,  Thembi (Impulse!, 1971)
1971: Gato Barbieri, Under Fire (Flying Dutchman, 1973)
1974: Dave Brubeck, All The Things We Are (Atlantic, 1976)
1975: Duke Jordan Quartet, Misty Thursday (SteepleChase, 1976)
1976: Duke Jordan Trio, Live in Japan (SteepleChase, 1977)
1976: Duke Jordan Trio, Flight to Japan (SteepleChase, 1978)
1976: Tommy Flanagan, Trinity (Inner City, 1980)
1976: Warne Marsh, How Deep, How High (Interplay, 1980)
1977: Mary Lou Williams, A Grand Night For Swinging (High Note, 2008)
1977?: Nick Brignola Sextet with Pepper Adams, Baritone Madness (Galaxy, 1978)
1978: Dizzy Reece, Manhattan Project (Bee Hive, 1978)
1978: Dizzy Reece and Ted Curson, Blowin' Away (Interplay, 1978)
1978?: Johnny Griffin, Birds and Ballads (Galaxy, 1978)
1978: Gary Burton, Times Square (ECM, 1979)
1978: Alice Coltrane, Transfiguration (Warner Bros., 1978)[2LP]
1978: Art Pepper, Art Pepper Today (Galaxy, 1979)
1978: Sal Nistico, Neo/Nistico (Bee Hive, 1978)
1978: Red Garland, Equinox (Galaxy, 1979)
1978: Hank Jones, Ain't Misbehavin' (Galaxy, 1979)
1978: Stanley Cowell, Equipoise (Galaxy, 1979)
1978: Archie Shepp, Lady Bird (Denon, 1979)
1979: Ted Curson, The Trio (Interplay, 1979)
1979: Joe Albany, Bird Lives! (Interplay, 1979)
1981: Chick Corea, Trio Music (ECM, 1982)
1983: Freddie Hubbard, Sweet Return (Atlantic, 1983)
1983?: Toshiyuki Honda, Dream (Eastworld, 1983)
1984: Chick Corea, Trio Music Live in Europe (ECM, 1986) – live. Grammy nominated album.
1987: McCoy Tyner, Blues for Coltrane: A Tribute to John Coltrane (Impulse!, 1988) – Grammy won album
1987: Michel Petrucciani, Michel plays Petrucciani (Blue Note, 1988)
1987: Chick Corea, Live in Montreaux (GRP, 1994) – live
1988: Mark Isaacs, Encounters, with Dave Holland (ABC, 1990 & 1995; veraBra, 1991; Gracemusic, 2013)
1989: Pat Metheny, Question and Answer (Geffen, 1990)
1994: Kenny Barron, Wanton Spirit (Verve, 1994) – Grammy nominated album
1995: Michel Petrucciani & Stephane Grappelli, Flamingo (Dreyfus, 1996)
1996: Chick Corea, Remembering Bud Powell (Stretch, 1997) – Grammy nominated album
1997: Gary Burton, Like Minds (Concord, 1998) – Grammy won album
2010: Sonny Rollins, Road Shows vol. 2 (Doxy, 2011) – live

References

External links
 Roy Haynes – Featured Musician (Drummer Cafe)
 Drummerworld article
Interview
Concert Review
Interview for the NAMM Oral History Program (2008)

1925 births
Living people
Musicians from Boston
People from Roxbury, Boston
American people of Barbadian descent
Jazz musicians from Massachusetts
20th-century American drummers
20th-century American male musicians
African-American drummers
American jazz bandleaders
American jazz drummers
American male drummers
Bebop drummers
Circle (jazz band) members
Grammy Lifetime Achievement Award winners
Hard bop drummers
American male jazz musicians
EmArcy Records artists
Galaxy Records artists
Impulse! Records artists
Mainstream Records artists
Prestige Records artists
Verve Records artists
20th-century African-American musicians
21st-century African-American people